Stickygate may refer to:

 Stickygate, a controversy in the 2020 New York's 22nd congressional district election
 The 2021 pitch doctoring controversy in Major League Baseball

See also
List of "-gate" scandals and controversies